Jon Randolph Seeliger (born 27 April 1995) is a South African sprinter. He competed in the 4 × 400 metres relay at the 2016 IAAF World Indoor Championships.

Competition record

1Disqualified in the final

Personal bests
Outdoor
200 metres – 20.71 (+0.2 m/s, Pretoria 2014)
400 metres – 45.85 (Stellenbosch 2015)

References

External links
 

1995 births
Living people
South African male sprinters
Place of birth missing (living people)
University of Pretoria alumni
Competitors at the 2015 Summer Universiade
Competitors at the 2019 Summer Universiade
Universiade medalists in athletics (track and field)
Universiade silver medalists for South Africa